The third season of the American television comedy series Louie premiered on June 28, 2012 and concluded on September 27, 2012. It consisted of thirteen episodes, each running approximately 23 minutes in length. FX broadcast the third season on Thursdays at 10:30 pm in the United States. The season was produced by 3 Arts Entertainment and the executive producers were Louis C.K., Dave Becky and M. Blair Breard.

Louie was created, written and directed by Louis C.K., who stars as a fictionalized version of himself, a comedian and newly divorced father raising his two daughters in New York City. The show has a loose format atypical for television comedy series, consisting of largely unconnected storylines and segments (described as "extended vignettes") that revolve around Louie's life, punctuated by live stand-up performances.

The season received critical acclaim.

Cast

Main cast
 Louis C.K. as Louie

Recurring cast

Guest stars

Episodes

Reception

Reviews
The third season of Louie received universal acclaim reviews from critics, receiving a Metacritic score of 94 out of 100, based on 16 reviews. Verne Gay of Newsday named it "One of TV's best shows, comedy or drama, because this series often succeeds as both." Matt Zoller Seitz of Vulture called it "bizarre, inventive, and bold" and Rob Owen of the Pittsburgh Post-Gazette said "the series remains smart and thought-provoking but it's also quite funny." On Rotten Tomatoes, the season has an approval rating of 100% with an average score of 9.2 out of 10 based on 22 reviews. The website's critical consensus reads, "Louie continues its evolution as a show that deftly – and bravely – juggles comedy, philosophy, and raunch."

Awards and nominations
Louis C.K. and Pamela Adlon won for Best Television Comedy series for the 65th Writers Guild of America Awards. C.K. was nominated for both the Golden Globe Award for Best Actor – Television Series Musical or Comedy and the Screen Actors Guild Award for Outstanding Performance by a Male Actor in a Comedy Series, for the 70th Golden Globe Awards and the 19th Screen Actors Guild Awards, respectively. The series was also included as one of the Top Television Programs of the Year by the American Film Institute and won a 2013 Peabody Award. For the 65th Primetime Emmy Awards, the series received nominations for Outstanding Comedy Series; C.K. was nominated for Outstanding Lead Actor in a Comedy Series, Outstanding Writing for a Comedy Series ("Daddy's Girlfriend Part 1"), and Outstanding Directing for a Comedy Series ("New Year's Eve"); Susan E. Morse was nominated for Outstanding Single-Camera Picture Editing for a Comedy Series ("Daddy's Girlfriend Part 2"); and Melissa Leo won for Outstanding Guest Actress in a Comedy Series. At the 29th TCA Awards, C.K. won for Individual Achievement in Comedy and the series was nominated for Outstanding Achievement in Comedy.

References

External links
 

2012 American television seasons